Robert Wheatley is an Australian football player.

Robert Wheatley may also refer to:

Robert Wheatley (MP) (died 1558), an English MP
Robert Wheatley (governor), a Governor of Barbados